Zalukokoazhe is a rural locality (a settlement)  and the administrative center of Zolsky District of the Kabardino-Balkar Republic, Russia. Population:

References

Notes

Sources

Rural localities in Kabardino-Balkaria